Sibley Township is the name of some places in the U.S. state of Minnesota:
Sibley Township, Crow Wing County, Minnesota
Sibley Township, Sibley County, Minnesota

Minnesota township disambiguation pages